Gaëtan Dugas (February 19, 1952 – March 30, 1984) was a Québécois Canadian flight attendant and a relatively early patient with the human immunodeficiency virus (HIV), who once was widely misdescribed as "Patient Zero", accusing him of introducing the acquired immunodeficiency syndrome (AIDS) in the United States. This claim, a blatant misapplication from the results of a narrowly focused study, has been definitively proven incorrect.

In March 1984, a Centers for Disease Control and Prevention (CDC) study tracked the sexual liaisons and practices of some gay and bisexual men, especially in California and New York. Dugas was code-named "Patient O" (meaning "o"ut of state) to indicate his role in a particular cluster of 40 AIDS cases in the United States. A 1987 non-fiction book about the epidemic, And the Band Played On, chose to use the term "Patient Zero" and put significant focus on Dugas; from this, media outlets further misinterpreted and extrapolated the information from this relatively small study to mean that he introduced AIDS to the United States, although the study itself made no such claim. Later, as the misinterpretation persisted, scientists performed a genetic analysis of stored blood samples, bolstered by historical detective work, to specifically confirm that Dugas did not bring HIV to the United States and was not Patient Zero.

Dugas worked as a flight attendant for Air Canada and died in Quebec City in March 1984 as a result of kidney failure caused by AIDS-related infections.

1984 cluster study

A study published in The American Journal of Medicine in 1984 titled Cluster of Cases of the Acquired Immune Deficiency Syndrome examined the sexual contacts of gay men infected with AIDS to determine if their histories were consistent with the hypothesis that AIDS was caused by an infectious agent. A graph included with the paper traced the sequence of infection among 40 men and labelled one of the nodes as "Patient 0" (with other nodes including the place of residence and a number indicating the sequence in which they developed AIDS symptoms, such as "NY 14"). The paper later stated:

The researchers later stated they had originally intended to designate Dugas as "Patient O", with "O" standing for "Out-of-California" but at some point it was changed to a "0".

"Patient Zero" designation
Dugas is featured prominently in Randy Shilts's 1987 book And the Band Played On: Politics, People, and the AIDS Epidemic (1987), which documents the outbreak of the AIDS epidemic in the United States. Shilts refers to Dugas as "Patient Zero" and portrays him as having almost sociopathic behaviour by allegedly intentionally infecting, or at least recklessly endangering, others with the virus. Dugas is described as being a charming, handsome sexual athlete who, according to his own estimation, averaged hundreds of sex partners per year. He claimed to have had over 2,500 sexual partners across North America since becoming sexually active in 1972. In David France's 2016 book How to Survive a Plague, Shilts's editor expressed his regret for having "made a conscious decision to vilify Dugas in the book and publicity campaign in order to spur sales."

Genetic analysis historically provided some support for the Patient Zero theory, in which Dugas was believed to be part of a cluster of homosexual men who travelled frequently, were extremely sexually active, and died of AIDS at a very early stage in the epidemic.

Re-examination

A number of authorities have since voiced reservations about the implications of the CDC's Patient Zero study and characterizations of Dugas as being responsible for bringing HIV to cities such as Los Angeles and San Francisco. In the Patient Zero study, the average length of time between sexual contact and the onset of symptoms was  months. While Shilts's book does not make such an allegation, the rumour that Dugas was the principal disseminator of the virus became widespread. In 1988, Andrew R. Moss published an opposing view in The New York Review of Books.

In 2016, a group of researchers led by evolutionary biologist Dr. Michael Worobey conducted a genetic study that looked at blood samples taken from gay and bisexual men in 1978 and 1979 as part of a hepatitis B study, and based on the results of the data, concluded that Dugas was not the source of the virus in the U.S. "On the family tree of the virus, Dugas fell in the middle, not at the beginning." "Beliefs about Patient Zero," Worobey concludes, "are unsupported by scientific data." Worobey's paper, published in Nature in October 2016, finds "neither biological nor historical evidence that he was the primary case in the US or for subtype B as a whole."

A study by historian Richard McKay of Cambridge and others identified several causes for the Patient Zero myth. During early CDC analysis of cases in California, patient 057 (Dugas) was nicknamed patient "O" for "Out-of-California", but this was interpreted by others as Patient Zero. Dugas was particularly helpful in tracing his network of partners, providing names and addresses for many of them, which was further expanded because others remembered his distinctive name. Although many of the patients analysed reported in excess of 1000 sexual partners, most remembered "only a handful" of names, making their contacts to other cases more difficult to trace. Richard McKay later extended this study into a book, "Patient Zero and the Making of the AIDS Epidemic." This book also contains the most definitive biography of Dugas' life, constructed through numerous interviews with friends, family, and lovers.

Robert M. Grant, an AIDS researcher at the University of California, has stated: "No one wants to be the Patient Zero of their village. But this may be helpful because it says, 'Just because you are the first to be diagnosed doesn't mean you started the epidemic.'"

Two films, John Greyson's musical comedy film Zero Patience (1993) and Laurie Lynd's documentary Killing Patient Zero (2019), have also discussed the Patient Zero myth around Dugas.

See also

 Timeline of early HIV/AIDS cases
 Timeline of HIV/AIDS

References

External links
 Halifax Rainbow Encyclopedia page for Dugas—he lived in Halifax for several years.
 
 AidsVancouver  - archive footage of Gaetan Dugas speaking at an Aids Vancouver forum (beginning at ~5:45)
 ‘Patient Zero’ no more - study reported in Science Magazine (Vol. 351, Issue 6277, pp. 1013), American Association for the Advancement of Science (AAAS) (Article)

1952 births
1984 deaths
Canadian gay men
AIDS-related deaths in Canada
Flight attendants
History of HIV/AIDS
Index cases
Canadian people of French descent
French Quebecers
People from Quebec City
Air Canada people
Deaths from kidney failure
People with HIV/AIDS
20th-century Canadian LGBT people